The M67 grenade is a fragmentation hand grenade used by the United States military. The M67 is a further development of the M33 grenade, itself a replacement for the M26-series grenades used during the Korean and Vietnam Wars, and the older Mk 2 "pineapple" grenade used since World War I.

Overview
The M67 grenade has a spheroidal steel body that contains  of composition B explosive. It uses the M213 pyrotechnic delay fuze. The M67 grenade weighs  in total and has a safety clip to prevent the safety pin on the grenade from being pulled accidentally. The safety pin prevents the safety lever, or "spoon" on the grenade from moving and releasing the spring-loaded striker which initiates the grenade's fuse assembly.

The M67 is typically known as a "baseball" grenade, because it is shaped like a ball that can be easily thrown. According to the FY2021 US Army Justification, the average cost of a single M67 grenade is around 45 US dollars.

The M67 can be thrown  by the average male soldier. Its fuse delays detonation between 4 and 5 seconds after the spoon is released.

Variants

M33 Fragmentation Grenade
The M33 was the original successor to the M26 fragmentation grenade. It was essentially identical to the M67, but lacked the safety clip that is fitted to the safety lever of the M67.

M68 Fragmentation Grenade
This is a variant of the M67 fitted with the M217 impact fuze and a safety clip on the safety lever.  This fuze has an electrical impact function which arms within 1 to 2 seconds and will detonate the grenade upon impact, and a back-up pyrotechnic delay function which will initiate the grenade after 3 to 7 seconds if the impact function fails. The M68 has the same specifications and markings as the M67 except it has a red-painted fuze and lever to indicate it has an impact fuze.

M33A1 and M59 Fragmentation Grenades
Predecessors to the M68, these impact-fuzed grenades used the M33 grenade body fitted with the M217 impact fuze, without a safety clip on the safety lever, and are marked similarly to the M68.

M69 Practice Grenade
The M69 grenade is used for grenade training to safely simulate the M67 grenade. The fuze screws into the body, and is replaceable after use. The simulator produces a report and a small puff of white smoke when employed.

The M69 has a blue-painted lever and a blue body with white markings. This is to indicate that it is a safe practice grenade rather than a live fragmentation grenade like the M33 or M67.

Users
: Used in the Falklands War.
: Temporarily used by the Australian Defence Force following a safety incident with the domestically produced F1 grenade in 2007.
: Used by the Canadian Forces; designated as the C-13 Grenade and produced domestically by General Dynamics' Canadian division.
: Army, Air force and Navy.

: Used by the Armed Forces of Malta.
: Army.
: Armed Forces.
: Used by the Armed Forces of the Philippines and Philippine National Police-Special Action Force.
: Armed Forces.
: Used by the Turkish Armed Forces.
: Primary fragmentation hand grenade of the United States Armed Forces since the 1960s.
: C-13 grenades donated as part of Canadian military aid during the Russo-Ukrainian War.

See also
United States hand grenades
BEANO T-13 grenade
HG 85

Notes

External links

FAS fact sheet
Additional photos of the M67
Cost of an M67 grenade source
Day & Zimmermann datasheet

Hand grenades of the United States
United States Marine Corps equipment
Fragmentation grenades
Military equipment introduced in the 1960s